The International Fund for Animal Welfare (IFAW) is one of the largest animal welfare and conservation charities in the world. The organization works to rescue individual animals, safeguard populations, preserve habitat, and advocate for greater protections. Brian Davies founded IFAW. IFAW was instrumental in ending the commercial seal hunt in Canada. In 1983 Europe banned all whitecoat harp seals products. This ban helped save over 1 million seals. IFAW operates in over 40 countries.

History

The International Fund for Animal Welfare (IFAW) was founded in 1969, in initial efforts to stop the commercial hunt for seal pups on the east coast of Canada.

With offices in 15 countries, and projects in more than 40, IFAW is one of the largest animal welfare organisations in the world.

The fund is supported by individual and major corporate donors, the latter including the Disneynature and the Disney Conservation Fund, the Petfinder Foundation and Arctic Fox, among others.

Activities
IFAW partners with elephant and rhino orphanages in Zambia, Zimbabwe and India, where the focus is on rescue, rehabilitation, release, and post-release monitoring and protection.
tenBoma is IFAW's counter-poaching initiative in Kenya, as featured on NBC's Sunday Night with Megyn Kelly and PBS NewsHour.
tenBoma architect, IFAW Senior Vice President Lt Col Faye Cuevas, was honored as one of Motherboard's Humans of the Year in 2017.
IFAW's Wildlife Crime program works to reduce demand for wildlife products, wildlife cybercrime and live animal exploitation and trafficking around the world.
IFAW's Marine Mammal Rescue and Research group (MMRR) is a team of scientists, veterinarians and other individuals committed to promoting the conservation of marine mammal species (dolphins, whales, porpoises, and seals) and their habitats. Cape Cod is a hot spot for mass stranding activity, and the team is called on for expertise in global events as well.
The Meet Us Don't Eat Us campaign aims to promote whale watching, as an alternative to whale hunting in Iceland.
IFAW aims to protect the last 400 critically endangered North Atlantic right whales and has developed acoustic detection systems, collaborated with lobstermen, commercial fishers and shipping industries to prevent collisions with ships and gear entanglements; and advocated for greater legislation to protect the species.
Through its DISRUPT wildlife crime prevention program, IFAW trains customs officers, game wardens and law enforcers in many countries to prevent the killing of endangered species.
IFAW protects elephants by protecting critical elephant habitats, managing human-elephant conflict, preventing poaching, ending illegal ivory trade and rescuing orphan and injured elephants.
Carrying out legislative and educational campaigns across the globe. This is an effort to try to prevent cruelty to animals, preserve endangered species, and protect wildlife habitats.

IFAW is best known for its leading role in the campaigns to end the commercial seal hunt in Canada and end commercial whaling, as well as its work to help dogs and cats in impoverished communities, protect elephants, end illegal ivory trade, rescue and release of wild animals such orphan rhinos and rescue of animals in the wake of disasters such as hurricane Katrina in the US.

Controversy and criticism

A financial manager of the Brian Davies Foundation, IFAW invested IFAW's money in organizations that carried out animal experiments, such as Bausch & Lomb, US Surgicals, Glaxo, Merck, Abbot, Upjohn, Philip Morris and McDonald's. When the investment was drawn to the attention of IFAW's trustees, the shares were sold immediately and the financial manager dismissed. 
 
When Davies retired from IFAW in 1997 to start Network for Animals, IFAW established a payment schedule to use his name and image for fundraising and campaigns. The contract was important for the continued level of success that IFAW achieved with Davies' leadership, according to research on successful animal welfare organizations". Davies had the following to say about it: "I signed an agreement with IFAW which was conceived by the trustees. I was opposed to the idea of receiving remuneration from two animal welfare organisations; this solution allowed me to run Network For Animals without pay for seven years."

See also 
Animal rights
Animal welfare
International Cat Day
List of animal welfare organizations
Petra Deimer, German marine biologist, nature conservationist, advisor to the fund

References

External links
Charity Navigator
Better Business Bureau Wise Giving Alliance

Charities based in Massachusetts
Organizations established in 1969
Criticisms of bullfighting
Animal charities based in the United States
Abandoned animals
Animal rescue groups
Animal rights organizations